Egyptalum (Egyptian Aluminium Company ) is the largest aluminium producer in Egypt and one of the largest in Africa having a total annual production of around 320,000 tonnes. The company is supplied with the electric energy it needs from the Aswan High Dam.

See also
 Aluminium smelting

References

External links
 Home page
State-owned Egyptalum struggles to find investors, Africa Intelligence, March 2, 2023 (requires free registration)

1972 establishments in Egypt
Manufacturing companies established in 1972
Aluminium companies of Egypt
Egyptian brands
Egypt–Soviet Union relations